Ari Taub (born September 27, 1965) is an American movie director, producer, and editor. Taub was born in New York City.

Taub is best known for his movie The Fallen, a 2004 war film about the perspectives of Italian, German, and American soldiers during World War II.

Taub's latest movie is '79 Parts (2019), a comedy set in 1979, starring Eric Roberts.

Taub also produced Stanley Cuba (2007), a parody of Stanley Kubrick films, starring Mike Birbiglia and directed by Per Anderson.

Filmography
 '79 Parts (2019)
 The Flying Ass Monkeys (TV series) (2012)
 Last Letters from Monte Rosa (2010)
 Life on the Edge of Town (short) (2010)
 2010 Fairies Fatale (short) (2010)
 The Fallen (2004)
 Letters from the Dead (2003)
 Writer's Block (short) (1996)
 The Red Herring (short) (1988)
 Harold Swerg (short) (with Ralph Soll) (1988)
  On Time (short) (1987)

Awards and nominations

References

External links
 
 '79 Parts official site
 

1965 births
Living people
Film producers from New York (state)
Film directors from New York City